La Arena is a corregimiento in Los Pozos District, Herrera Province, Panama with a population of 559 as of 2010. Its population as of 1990 was 509; its population as of 2000 was 533.

References

Corregimientos of Herrera Province